Dewas Naka is a suburb residential locality in the city of Indore, Madhya Pradesh, India. It got its name from a major industrial-town of Madhya Pradesh Dewas as it is the last suburb before the main Highway starts.
Elected Member of the Legislative Assembly is Ramesh Mendola.

Geography
Dewas Naka is home to the new Iron Market (Loha Mandi) and a slew of industries. It also has various automobile and oil related industrial shops and industries.

Neighbouring suburbs: Talawali Chanda, Lasudia Mori, Vijay Nagar, Manglaya Sadak

Arterial Roads: Agra-Bombay Road (NH 52)

Politics
Bhanwarkuan area falls under the Indore-2 Assembly Constituency in Indore District. The current elected Member is Ramesh Mendola from the BJP.

Transport
The nearest railway station is Manglia Gaon railway station. However, it is just a basic station. The Indore Junction railway station is the main junction to catch trains. Public transport such as autos, taxis, magic-vans, city buses are readily available.

Dewas Naka being located on the arterial A.B. Road (Agra–Bombay Road NH 52), several City Bus routes serve the area, with fares ranging from ₹10.00 to ₹25.00 or even more depending on distance. Bus Routes passing by main Niranjanpur Square are

Places of interest
Lasudia Lake
APJ Abdul Kalam University: a private university
 TATA IoN Centre

References

External links
 City portal at Govt. of India info. website
 

Suburbs of Indore
Neighbourhoods in Indore